Viktor Szabó (born 23 July 1986 in Gyöngyös, Hungary) is a Hungarian football player who currently plays for Soproni VSE.

External links
 HLSZ Profile (in Hungarian)

References

1986 births
Living people
People from Gyöngyös
Hungarian footballers
Vác FC players
Diósgyőri VTK players
Association football forwards
Sportspeople from Heves County